Halapricum (common abbreviation Hpr.) is a genus of halophilic archaea in the family of Haloarculaceae.

References

Archaea genera
Taxa described in 2014
Euryarchaeota